Suvarna Bhoomi (Kannada: ಸುವರ್ಣ ಭೂಮಿ) is a 1969 Indian Kannada film, directed by A. M. Sameevulla and produced by A. M. Sameevulla. The film stars Rajesh, Sudarshan, Dinesh and Shakthi Prasad in lead roles. The film had musical score by Vijaya Bhaskar.

Cast

Rajesh
Sudarshan
Dinesh
Shakti Prasad
M. S. Sathya
Hanumanthachar
Pandari Bai
Udayachandrika
Shailashree
Tara
Master Rajkumar
Master Krishnakumar
Master Srinivas
Baby Dhivyamani
Thoogudeepa Srinivas
Subba Rao
Phailwan Siddu
Gajendra
Srirang
Madangopal
Sathyaprakash

References

External links
 
 

1960s Kannada-language films
Films scored by Vijaya Bhaskar